The  Truman Bulldogs baseball program represents Truman State University in college baseball and competes in the Division II level of the National Collegiate Athletics Association (NCAA). In 2013, Truman became a member of the Great Lakes Valley Conference, prior to this Truman was in the Mid-America Intercollegiate Athletics Association from 1966–2012. TSU's home games are played at the Bulldogs Baseball Park in Kirksville, Missouri. The Bulldogs have made one appearance in the Division II Tournament as an at-large bid in the 2015, eventually making it to the College World Series.

History
Truman's baseball program dates back to 1966 when the program went 4–8. Since their inaugural season the Bulldogs claimed one Division II Tournament appearance as an at-large bid in 2015 in the Midwest Region. During this playoff berth, the Bulldogs won five consecutive games in the regional to advance to the Division II College World Series in Cary, North Carolina. The Bulldogs have an all-time record of 637-1333-6, which is a .323 winning percentage over 54 seasons of Bulldog Baseball.

Conference affiliations
 1966–2012 Mid-America Intercollegiate Athletics Association
 2013–present Great Lakes Valley Conference

All-time series records against GLVC members

Stadium

The Bulldogs have played their home games at Bulldogs Baseball Park since 1966. The stadium is located just to the south of Stokes Stadium (Truman's Football Stadium) and adjacent to the Bulldogs Softball Park. The current capacity of the stadium is at 250. The field has gone under many renovations during its time and consistently plays as one of the nicest playing surfaces in Division II.

Coaches

 Sam Nugent (1966–1980, 1982–1989) 238–338–1
 Kevin Finke (1981) 11–20
 Kirby Cannon (1990–1992) 38–88
 BJ Pumroy (1993–2000) 93–235
 Lawrence Scully (2001–2006) 73–193
 Dan Davis (2007–present) 184–371

Postseason

Division II Baseball Tournament
 NCAA Tournament Berths (1)
2015

 NCAA Division II College World Series Appearances
2015 (T-8th)

Alumni

 Dave Wehrmeister (1971–1972) – MLB Pitcher (1976–1978, 1981, 1984–1985) 3rd Overall Pick in 1973 Draft
 Al Nipper (1978–1980) – MLB Pitcher (1983–1989) 8th Round Pick in 1980 Draft
 Bruce Berenyi (1976) – MLB Pitcher (1980–1986) 3rd Overall Pick in 1976 Draft, World Series Champion with the 1986 Mets
 Guy Curtright – MLB Outfielder (1943–1946)
 Aaron Royster (1991-1994) - Drafted in the 35th Round by the Philadelphia Phillies
 Tony Vandemore (1996-1999) - Drafted in the 25th Round by the San Diego Padres
 Christian Witt (2008-2011) - Drafted in the 36th Round by the Kansas City Royals
 Charles Blakley (1968-1971) - Free Agent Signee by the St. Louis Cardinals in 1971
 Mark O'Reilly (1974) - Free Agent Signee by the Oakland Athletics in 1974
 Mike Lowes (1974-1977) - Free Agent Signee by the St. Louis Cardinals in 1977

References